John J. Tecklenburg (born September 1955) is an American businessman and politician. He is the current Mayor of Charleston, South Carolina. He was sworn in on January 11, 2016.

Early life and education
An Orangeburg native, Tecklenburg graduated from Georgetown University in Washington, D.C., with a Bachelor of Science in chemistry and later studied jazz at Berklee College of Music in Boston.

Career
Tecklenburg was Charleston's director of economic development from 1995 to 1999. He is a commercial realtor.

Tecklenburg ran for mayor of Charleston and won against Leon Stavrinakis on November 17, 2015. Tecklenburg was preceded by Joe Riley who was mayor of Charleston for 40 years.

In June 2020, in the wake of widespread protests against racism, Mayor Tecklenburg announced a decision to remove a statue of John C. Calhoun, a prominent South Carolinian defender of slavery, from a prominent public space in Charleston, in Marion Square.

Personal life
Tecklenburg and his wife Sandy have five children and five grandchildren.

In May 2018, Tecklenburg was removed from being a conservator for an elderly woman. Tecklenburg had used his ward's funds to make unsecured loans to himself and his wife totaling $80,000. He had not sought the court's approval as required by law.

References

1955 births
American real estate brokers
American real estate businesspeople
Berklee College of Music alumni
Businesspeople from South Carolina
Georgetown College (Georgetown University) alumni
Living people
Mayors of Charleston, South Carolina
South Carolina Democrats